eWRC-results.com is a Czech online database website founded in 2006. The website features data and statistics in the motorsport of rallying that ranges from World Rally Championship to national rally events dating back to 1911.

Shutdown
In early 2022, the website was once forced to shut down due to financial issue.

Partnership
On 18 May 2022, DirtFish announced partnership with the website, which would ensure greater visibility and useability in terms of rallying result. Former Hyundai Motorsport team principal Andrea Adamo oversaw the deal.

References

External links
 

2006 establishments in the Czech Republic
Czech websites
Online databases
Rallying